Maria Amalia of Brandenburg-Schwedt (26 November 1670 in Cölln – 17 November 1739 at Bertholdsburg Castle in Schleusingen) was a princess from the Brandenburg-Schwedt line of the House of Hohenzollern and by marriage a Duchess of Saxe-Zeitz.

Family 
She was the daughter of the "Great Elector" Frederick William of Brandenburg from his second marriage with Sophia Dorothea of Schleswig-Holstein-Sonderburg-Glücksburg, daughter of Duke Philip of Schleswig-Holstein-Sonderburg-Glücksburg.

Life 
In 1709, while she was a duchess, she visited the William Fountain, a medicinal spring in Schleusingen.  She promoted the development of Schleusingen as a spa.

She died in 1739, at the age of 68, at the castle in Schleusingen that had earlier served as the seat of the Counts of Henneberg-Schleusingen.  She had received this castle as her widow seat.  Via her daughter, she was related to the Landgraviate family in Hesse and on that basis, she was buried in the royal crypt in the Martinskirche, Kassel.

Marriage and issue 
Her first marriage was on 20 August 1687 in Potsdam with Prince Charles of Mecklenburg-Güstrow, the son of the Duke Gustav Adolph of Mecklenburg-Güstrow and Magdalene Sibylle of Holstein-Gottorp.  They had one child, who was born on 15 March 1688 and died later that day.  Her husband also died that day.

She married her second husband on 25 June 1689 in Potsdam.  He was Duke Maurice William of Saxe-Zeitz, the son of Duke Maurice of Saxe-Zeitz and Dorothea Maria of Saxe-Weimar.  She survived him by 21 years.  They had the following children:
Frederick William (Moritzburg, 26 March 1690 – Moritzburg, 15 May 1690).
Dorothea Wilhelmine (Moritzburg, 20 March 1691 – Kassel, 17 March 1743), married on 27 September 1717 to Landgrave William VIII of Hesse-Kassel.
Karoline Amalie (Moritzburg, 24 May 1693 – Moritzburg, 5 September 1694).
Sophie Charlotte (Moritzburg, 25 April 1695 – Moritzburg, 18 June 1696).
Frederick Augustus (Moritzburg, 12 August 1700 – Halle, 17 February 1710).

External links 
 
 Johann Hübner's ...Three hundred and thirty three and Genealogical Tables, Table 171

Duchesses of Saxe-Zeitz
House of Hohenzollern
House of Mecklenburg
House of Wettin
1670 births
1739 deaths
17th-century German people
18th-century German people
⚭Marie Amalie of Brandenburg
Daughters of monarchs